Lorraine Stanley (born 28 June 1976) is an English actress, known for playing Kelly in the 2006 film London to Brighton and Karen Taylor in the BBC soap opera EastEnders.

Personal life
Stanley was born in Portsmouth, Hampshire, the daughter of June (née Bukinsky), and David Stanley. She has Scottish and Polish ancestry from her father and mother respectively. She was brought up in Portsmouth by her parents, who divorced when she was ten years old. She then trained at London's Arts Educational School.

Stanley and her partner Mark Perez have been together since 2014, and have a daughter, named Nancy, born in 2015.

Filmography

Theatre

References

External links
 
 

1976 births
English film actresses
English television actresses
English stage actresses
Actresses from Portsmouth
Actresses from London
Anglo-Scots
British people of Polish descent
Living people
English soap opera actresses